Routing is the process of path selection in a network, such as a computer network or transportation network.

Routing may also refer to:

 Route of administration, the path by which a drug, fluid, poison or other substance is brought into contact with the body
 Hollowing out an area of wood or plastic using a router (woodworking)
 National Routeing Guide, a guide to trains over the United Kingdom's rail network 
 Routing (hydrology), a technique used to predict the changes in shape of a hydrograph 
 ABA routing transit number, a bank code used in the United States
 Routing number (Canada)
 Weather routing

In electronics and computer technologies:
 Routing (electronic design automation), a step in the design of printed circuit boards and integrated circuits 
 The packet forwarding algorithm in a computer network
 The role of a router hardware in a computer network

See also 
 Forwarding (disambiguation)
 Route (disambiguation)
 Router (disambiguation)
 Rout
 Vehicle routing problem